Allison Miller (born 1985) is American actress.

Alison or Allison Miller may also refer to:
 Allison Miller (artist) (born 1974), American contemporary abstract painter
 Alison Miller (rugby union) (born 1984), Irish rugby player
 Allison Miller (dancer), of the American Ballet Theatre Studio Company and the Houston Ballet
 Allison Miller (drummer), American drummer, singer, and composer
 Alison Miller, American mathematician
 Alison Miller, Conservative candidate in the City of Edinburgh Council election, 2007
 Allison Miller, fashion editor for Brooklyn-based women's magazine Missbehave
 Allison Miller, fictional character in the slasher film Bereavement

See also
Alice Miller (disambiguation)